Psittacastis is a moth genus of the family Depressariidae.

Species
 Psittacastis argentata Meyrick, 1921
 Psittacastis championella (Walsingham, 1912)
 Psittacastis cocae (Busck, 1931)
 Psittacastis cosmodoxa Meyrick, 1921
 Psittacastis eumolybda Meyrick, 1926
 Psittacastis eurychrysa Meyrick, 1909
 Psittacastis gaulica Meyrick, 1909
 Psittacastis incisa (Walsingham, 1912)
 Psittacastis molybdaspis Meyrick, 1926
 Psittacastis pictrix Meyrick, 1921
 Psittacastis propriella (Walker, 1864)
 Psittacastis pyrsophanes Meyrick, 1936
 Psittacastis stigmaphylli (Walsingham, 1912)
 Psittacastis superatella (Walker, 1864)
 Psittacastis trierica Meyrick, 1909

References

 
Depressariinae